Pyridinium chlorochromate (PCC) is a yellow-orange salt with the formula [C5H5NH]+[CrO3Cl]−. It is a reagent in organic synthesis used primarily for oxidation of alcohols to form carbonyls. A variety of related compounds are known with similar reactivity. PCC offers the advantage of the selective oxidation of alcohols to aldehydes or ketones, whereas many other reagents are less selective.

Structure and preparation

PCC consists of a pyridinium cation, [C5H5NH]+, and a tetrahedral chlorochromate anion, [CrO3Cl]−. Related salts are also known, such as 1-butylpyridinium chlorochromate, [C5H5N(C4H9)][CrO3Cl] and potassium chlorochromate.

PCC is commercially available. Discovered by accident, the reagent was originally prepared via addition of pyridine into a cold solution of chromium trioxide in concentrated hydrochloric acid:

C5H5N + HCl + CrO3 → [C5H5NH][CrO3Cl]

In one alternative method, formation of chromyl chloride (CrO2Cl2) fume during the making of the aforementioned solution was minimized by simply changing the order of addition: a cold solution of pyridine in concentrated hydrochloric acid was added to solid chromium trioxide under stirring.

Uses

Oxidation of alcohols
PCC is used as an oxidant. In particular, it has proven to be highly effective in oxidizing primary and secondary alcohols to aldehydes and ketones, respectively. The reagent is more selective than the related Jones' Reagent, so there is little chance of over-oxidation to form carboxylic acids if acidified potassium permanganate is used as long as water is not present in the reaction mixture. A typical PCC oxidation involves addition of an alcohol to a suspension of PCC in dichloromethane. The general reaction is:

2 [C5H5NH][CrO3Cl] + 3 R2CHOH → 2 [C5H5NH]Cl + Cr2O3 + 3 R2C=O + 3 H2O

For example, the triterpene lupeol was oxidized to lupenone:

Babler oxidation 
With tertiary alcohols, the chromate ester formed from PCC can isomerize via a [3,3]-sigmatropic reaction and following oxidation yield an enone, in a reaction known as the Babler oxidation:

This type of oxidative transposition reaction has been synthetically utilized, e.g. for the synthesis of morphine.

Using other common oxidants in the place of PCC usually leads to dehydration, because such alcohols cannot be oxidized directly.

Other reactions 
PCC also converts suitable unsaturated alcohols and aldehydes to cyclohexenones. This pathway, an oxidative cationic cyclization, is illustrated by the conversion of (−)-citronellol to (−)-pulegone.

PCC also effects allylic oxidations, for example, in conversion of dihydrofurans to furanones.

Related reagents
Other more convenient or less toxic reagents for oxidizing alcohols include dimethyl sulfoxide, which is used in Swern and Pfitzner–Moffatt oxidations, and hypervalent iodine compounds, such as the Dess–Martin periodinane.

Safety
One disadvantage to the use of PCC is its toxicity, which it shares with other hexavalent chromium compounds.

See also
Oxidation with chromium(VI)-amine complexes
Babler oxidation

References

Further reading

External links
 IARC Monographs Supplement 7, Chromium and Chromium Compounds
 History of PCC
 National Pollutant Inventory, Chromium(VI) Compounds Fact Sheets

Chromates
Oxidizing agents
Pyridinium compounds
IARC Group 1 carcinogens